Bailey Smith (born 7 December 2000) is a professional Australian rules football player. Smith was recruited by the Western Bulldogs with the 7th draft pick in the 2018 AFL draft, making his debut in the 2019 AFL season. He received a nomination for the 2019 AFL Rising Star award in round 9 of the 2019 season, placing fourth in the overall count at the conclusion of the season. Since then, he has been a dual member of the 22under22 team, and a recipient of the Chris Grant Best First Year Player Award.

Early life and career
Smith played his early career for the East Malvern Junior Football Club in Melbourne's south-east. In 2011, he won the MSJFL under-11 west division best and fairest award. He also won a best and fairest with Xavier College while playing in the team in Year 11, and was named as a member of the AIS-AFL Academy. Smith played for the Sandringham Dragons in the NAB League for the 2017 and 2018 seasons. In his 2017 season with the Dragons, he had a very solid year as a bottom-ager, averaging 24.3 disposals and 4 tackles a game. Playing as a half-back, his breakout game with the Dragons came in the eleventh round of the season, where he collected 34 and 5 clearances to help the Dragons to a 49-point victory over the Geelong Falcons. The following week, he again led the team for disposals, collecting 32 disposals in a thrilling 1-point win over the Gippsland Power. In the fourteenth round of the season, Smith was named as the player of the round after he had the best game of his career to that point, totalling 44 disposals, 13 inside 50s and 10 clearances. At the conclusion of the season, Smith was awarded best first year player award after his promising performances.
 
Smith was named captain of Xavier College's first XVIII football team, as well as for the Sandringham Dragons, for the 2018 season. Smith was named the captain. However, he would only play two games with the team as a result of an Achilles tendon injury as well as clashing representative and school team commitments. In his first game of the season, Smith had an excellent game, collecting 37 disposals, 7 tackles and 12 clearances to be one of the best on ground. His other game came on 28 April, where he collected 28 disposals against the Western Jets. Smith was also selected to play for Vic Metro in the AFL Under 18 Championships for the 2018 season. He had his best game in the third round of the tournament, where he tallied up 20 disposals and 3 goals in what was close to a best on ground performance. He was also named in the team's best in all of the other rounds. Smith claimed Vic Metro's Most Valuable Player Award, and was named in the Under 18 All-Australian team as a midfielder. Smith was eventually taken at pick 7 by the Western Bulldogs in the 2018 AFL draft.

AFL career

2019-2020: Early career
When first coming to the club, it was revealed that Smith would inherit the no.6 guernsey from the outgoing Luke Dahlhaus. He missed out on a large amount of the pre-season, as a result of the Achilles tendon injury he suffered in his draft year. Despite this setback, Smith made his AFL debut in the Western Bulldogs' win over the Sydney Swans in the opening round of the 2019 AFL season. On debut, Smith collected just 8 disposals and 4 tackles. However, he would improve from there, collecting 13 disposals the next week and 22 disposals the week after that. He earned a 2019 AFL Rising Star nomination in the Bulldogs' Round 9 loss to Geelong, totalling 28 disposals, 10 contested possessions and 5 clearances. Smith had a very solid game against  in round 20, collecting 27 disposals and 4 clearances. At the conclusion of the season, Smith finished fourth in the 2019 NAB Rising Star award behind Sam Walsh, Connor Rozee and Sydney Stack. He was also named as the Chris Grant Best First Year Player for the Western Bulldogs. In December 2019, it was revealed that Smith would sign on with the Bulldogs until the end of 2022. 

Smith had a successful 2020 season in what was to be a season majorly affected by the COVID-19 pandemic. He did not miss a single game the entire year, meaning he had played 35 consecutive games. Smith suffered a concussion early in the Bulldogs' round 5 clash against  after being tackled by Shaun Atley, but was named fit to play the following week, continuing his run of consecutive games. Smith stood up in many disappointing losses that year, again being named as the team's best in an dismal 52-point loss to  after collecting 26 disposals and a goal. His efforts in that game saw him collect 1 Brownlow Medal vote despite being on the losing side. He followed this game up with a best on ground performance the following week which earned him 3 Brownlow Medal votes, tallying 26 disposals and a goal against . After the finish of the season, Smith was named ruck rover of the 2020 22 Under 22 team.

2021-2022: Improvement and controversies 
The 2021 season was to be a season of improvement for Smith, rotating through different positions such as midfielder, wingman and forward. He had a good start to the pre-season, winning the team's running test, a display of his improved fitness. He also earned 3 Brownlow Medal votes as a result of his performance. After a quiet patch of form in the mid-season, Smith began to stamp his presence on games more regularly. In round 15, he had 31 disposals and 2 goals to be best on ground behind the captain Marcus Bontempelli, which earned him 2 Brownlow Medal votes.

In June 2022, a video surfaced of Smith holding a bag of white powder at a party late in 2021. As a result, Smith issued a statement admitting to possessing an illicit substance. Smith subsequently received a 2-match suspension.

Statistics
 Statistics are correct to the end of round 7, 2022

|- style="background-color: #EAEAEA"
! scope="row" style="text-align:center" | 2019
|
| 6 || 23 || 11 || 10 || 184 || 222 || 406 || 58 || 93 || 0.5 || 0.4 || 8.0 || 9.7 || 17.7 || 2.5 || 4.0 || 0
|-
! scope="row" style="text-align:center" | 2020
|
| 6 || 18 || 6 || 9 || 190 || 192 || 382 || 30 || 45 || 0.3 || 0.5 || 10.6 || 10.7 || 21.2 || 1.7 || 2.5 || 7
|- style="background-color: #EAEAEA"
! scope="row" style="text-align:center" | 2021
|
| 6 || 26 || 17 || 13 || 354 || 259 || 613 || 97 || 87 || 0.7 || 0.5 || 13.6 || 10.0 || 23.6 || 3.7 || 3.3 || 8
|-
! scope="row" style="text-align:center" | 2022
|
| 6 || 17 || 6 || 10 || 285 || 210 || 495 || 63 || 65 || 0.2 || 1.0 || 19.7 || 13.3 || 33.0 || 5.2 || 4.5 || 10
|- class="sortbottom"
! colspan=3| Career
! 84
! 40
! 38
! 846
! 753
! 1599
! 216
! 252
! 0.5
! 0.5
! 11.6
! 10.3
! 21.9
! 3.0
! 3.5
! 25
|}

Notes

Personal life
Smith has a strong presence on social media, with the most followers on Instagram out of all players in the AFL, totalling 364,000 followers. He is also recognised for his distinct mullet hairstyle. Smith has been open about his mental health struggles, with his former teammate Dale Morris being a mentor to Smith, helping him to deal with his struggles. In May 2020, Smith took part in the Big Freeze challenge, where the contestants jump into icy water to help raise funds to combat Motor neuron disease.

Honours and achievements
Individual
 Chris Grant Best First Year Player: 2019
 22 Under 22 team: 2020, 2021
 Bob Rose-Charlie Sutton Medal: 2021

References

External links

2000 births
Living people
Western Bulldogs players
Australian rules footballers from Melbourne
Sandringham Dragons players
People educated at Xavier College